Cape Norman is a barren, limestone headland located at the northernmost point of insular Newfoundland in the Canadian province of Newfoundland and Labrador.

Cape Norman first appeared on French maps as Cape Dordois, in 1713, and then as Cape Normand in 1744. Eventually, the name became anglicised to Cape Norman.

Cape Norman Lighthouse
The Canadian government built a wooden, hexagonal lighthouse at Cape Norman during the summer construction seasons of 1870 and 1871, and the lighthouse was lit for the first time on 1 October 1871. A local man, Henry Locke, was hired as lightkeeper. In 1890, following a shipwreck at Belle Isle the previous summer, a steam-operated fog alarm was installed at the Cape Norman. John Warren Campbell, a steam engineer from Pictou, Nova Scotia, was hired as lightkeeper and fog alarm engineer, replacing Henry Locke, who was superannuated at that point. John Warren Campbell arrived at Cape Norman on board the SS Montreal in July 1890, beginning a family tenure which lasted until the station was automated in 1992; the last of Campbell family lightkeepers was Alvin Campbell, great-grandson of John Warren Campbell.

See also
List of lighthouses in Canada
Henri de Miffonis

References

External links
 Aids to Navigation Canadian Coast Guard
 Lighthouse information
 Lighthouse at Cape Norman

Norman
Lighthouses in Newfoundland and Labrador